Vaya Draganova (Bulgarian: Вая Драганова; born 25 September 2003) is a Bulgarian rhythmic gymnast. She is a 2022 European Champion in teams.

Career

Junior 
She started competing internationally in 2017 as an individual. In 2018 she was among the girls that competed to represent Bulgaria at the Youth Olympic Games, but she didn't succeed in getting the spot, that went to Tatyana Volozhanina.

Senior 
In 2019 she was included in the national senior team, getting to compete at various World Cups, Grand Prix and tournaments. In late 2020 Draganova was included in the group. In 2022, when the girls of the previous group retired after becoming Olympic champions, she became a starter in the two routines. Her first competition was the Grand Prix in Marbella, Spain. The group then took part in the World Cup stages in Sofia (All-Around and 5 hoops gold, silver with 3 ribbons + 2 balls), Tashkent (All-Around and 5 hoops gold, bronze with 3 ribbons + 2 balls), Pesaro (All-Around and  3 ribbons + 2 balls silver and 5 hoops bronze), Pamplona (bronze with 5 hoops and silver with  3 ribbons + 2 balls) and Cluji-Napoca (All-Around, 5 hoops and 3 ribbons + 2 balls gold). In June she was part of the group for the European Championship in Tel Aviv, she won gold in the senior team category along with Zhenina Trashlieva, Sofia Ivanova, Kamelia Petrova, Rachel Stoyanov, Margarita Vasileva and the individuals Boryana Kaleyn and Stiliana Nikolova.

References 

2003 births
Living people
Bulgarian rhythmic gymnasts
Medalists at the Rhythmic Gymnastics European Championships